GOES-U is a planned weather satellite, the fourth and last of the GOES-R series of satellites operated by the National Oceanic and Atmospheric Administration (NOAA). The GOES-R series will extend the availability of the Geostationary Operational Environmental Satellite (GOES) system until 2036. The satellite will be built by Lockheed Martin, based on the A2100 platform.

Launch 
The satellite is expected to be launched into space atop a SpaceX Falcon Heavy rocket no earlier than 30 April 2024 from Kennedy Space Center, Florida, United States. The redesign of the loop heat pipe to prevent an anomaly, as seen in GOES-17, is not expected to delay the launch as it did with GOES-T.

GOES-U will also carry a copy of the Naval Research Laboratory's Compact CORonagraph (CCOR) instrument which, along with the CCOR planned for Space Weather Follow On-Lagrange 1 (SWFO-L1), will allow continued monitoring of solar wind after the retirement of the NASA-ESA SOHO satellite in 2025.

References 

Geostationary Operational Environmental Satellites
National Oceanic and Atmospheric Administration
Satellites using the A2100 bus
2024 in spaceflight